The Deadwood Coach is a 1924 American silent Western film written and directed by Lynn Reynolds. It is based on the 1908 novel The Orphan by Clarence E. Mulford. The film stars Tom Mix, George Bancroft, Doris May, Lucien Littlefield, Frank Coffyn, and Jane Keckley. The film was released on December 7, 1924, by Fox Film Corporation.

Plot
As described in a review in a film magazine, the chief aim of the Orphan (Mix) is to "get" Tex Wilson (Bancroft), the man who killed his parents. In trailing Wilson's gang, the Orphan averts the holdup of the Deadwood Coach, and thus meets Helen Shields (May), who is in route from the East to visit her brother Jim Shields, the local sheriff. Mix is a friend of the sheriff, having once saved him from the Indians. The sheriff tells Helen the story of the Orphan, and it generates additional interest on her part. When the wedding is about to happen, Tex Wilson breaks into the church and makes known his criminal identity. Tex escapes, taking the young woman with him, and is hotly pursued by the Orphan. Going through the badlands the coach, which Tex's men had stolen, breaks down and Tex, abandoning Helen, takes off on foot. The Orphan catches him and throws him off a tall cliff. Then he makes an about face in his life and settles down to a life of domestication with Helen.

Cast

Production
The Deadwood Coach was shot on location in Zion National Park and Cedar City, Utah.

Preservation
With no copies of The Deadwood Coach located in any film archives, it is a lost film.

References

External links

 
 

1924 films
1924 Western (genre) films
Fox Film films
Films directed by Lynn Reynolds
American black-and-white films
Silent American Western (genre) films
1920s English-language films
1920s American films